The Roanoke Rapids Micropolitan Statistical Area (μSA) as defined by the United States Census Bureau, is an area consisting of two counties in North Carolina, anchored by the city of Roanoke Rapids.

As of the 2000 census, the μSA had a population of 79,456 (though a July 1, 2009 estimate placed the population at 74,716).

Counties
Halifax
Northampton

Communities
Places with more than 10,000 inhabitants
Roanoke Rapids (Principal city)
Places with 1,000 to 10,000 inhabitants
Enfield 
Garysburg
Scotland Neck 
South Rosemary (census-designated place)
South Weldon (census-designated place)
Weldon
Places with 750 to 1,000 inhabitants
Gaston
Rich Square
Woodland
Places with 500 to 750  inhabitants
Conway
Jackson 
Littleton
Seaboard
Places with less than 500 inhabitants
Halifax
Hobgood
Lasker
Severn
Unincorporated places
Aurelian Springs
Brinkleyville
Heathsville
Margarettsville
Pleasant Hill

Demographics
As of the census of 2000, there were 79,456 people, 30,813 households, and 21,261 families residing within the μSA. The racial makeup of the μSA was 41.60% White, 54.47% African American, 2.36% Native American, 0.42% Asian, 0.03% Pacific Islander, 0.44% from other races, and 0.68% from two or more races. Hispanic or Latino of any race were 0.93% of the population.

The median income for a household in the μSA was $26,556, and the median income for a family was $34,082. Males had a median income of $27,998 versus $20,854 for females. The per capita income for the μSA was $14,612.

See also
North Carolina census statistical areas

References

 
Geography of Halifax County, North Carolina
Geography of Northampton County, North Carolina